Mundur may refer to:

 Mundur, Andhra Pradesh, a village in West Godavari district, India
 Mundur, Palakkad, a village in Palakkad district, Kerala, India
 Mundur Krishnankutty, an Indian writer from Mundur, Palakkad